Scopine is a tropane alkaloid found in a variety of plants including Mandragora root, Senecio mikanioides (Delairea odorata), Scopolia carniolica, and Scopolia lurida.

Scopine can be prepared by the hydrolysis of scopolamine.  It can also be prepared in three steps from N-methoxycarbonylpyrrole and 1,1,3,3-tetrabromoacetone; the reagents are combined in a [4+3] cycloaddition, followed by a diastereoselective reduction with diisobutylaluminum hydride, and finally a Prilezhaev epoxidation with trifluoroperacetic acid affords scopine.

See also 
 Aposcopolamine
 Umbelliferone

References 

Tropane alkaloids
Tropane alkaloids found in Solanaceae
Epoxides
Heterocyclic compounds with 1 ring